Belinda is a 1988 Australian film directed by Pamela Gibbons which stars Deanne Jeffs in the title role. The film was also known as Midnight Dancer.

Plot
Sixteen-year-old Australian girl Belinda (Deanne Jeffs) wants to become a ballerina. To makes ends meet, she takes a job as an exotic dancer in a Sydney cabaret. Eventually, she is able to reach her goal, but not before experiencing humanity at best and worst of times.

Cast
 Deanne Jeffs as Belinda
 Mary Regan as Crystal
 Kaarin Fairfax as Sandra
 Nicos Lathouris as Benny 
 Hazel Phillips as Doreen
 John Jarratt as Graeme
 Elizabeth Lord as Mandy
 Gerda Nicholson as Belinda's Mother
 Alan Cassell as Belinda's Father
 Tim Burns as Jamie

Production
The movie was autobiographical for Pamela Gibbons. It was shot in Sydney August to October 1986.

Awards

References

External links 
 
 
Belinda at Oz Movies

Australian drama films
1980s English-language films
1980s Australian films